is a Japanese voice actress and former singer. She is affiliated with Arts Vision. Her best-known role is in The Idolmaster video game franchise where she voices Hibiki Ganaha from the rival group known as Project Fairy. Other major roles include Pieck Finger in Attack on Titan, Mary in No Guns Life, Riko in Love Lab, Takao in Arpeggio of Blue Steel, Machi Tokiwa in Hanayamata and Saya Endō in Dagashi Kashi. She made her solo music debut in 2016, performing the opening theme to the anime series Magical Girl Raising Project. From 2013 to 2016, she was a member of the voice acting unit Trident.

Career
Numakura decided to become a voice actress while in high school after listening to a drama CD lent to her by a friend who liked anime; she also became a fan of the Gundam franchise during this time and she cited this as another reason for her deciding to become a voice actress.

Numakura made her voice acting debut in 2008 after auditioning for a role in the franchise The Idolmaster; she was cast as the character Hibiki Ganaha. She made her anime voice acting debut in 2009, playing the role of a student in an episode of the anime series Gintama. She would primarily voice background and supporting roles until 2011, when she played Hibiki in the anime adaptation of The Idolmaster.

In 2012, Numakura was cast as the role of Arata Obata in the anime series Black Rock Shooter and as the role of Yurika Tōdō in the franchise Aikatsu!. In 2013 she played the role of Riko Kurahashi in the anime series Love Lab and the role of Takao in the anime series Arpeggio of Blue Steel. Numakura, together with Mai Fuchigami and Hibiku Yamamura, formed the singing unit Trident, which performed songs for Arpeggio of Blue Steel. In 2014 she played Nanami Tokou in the anime series Brynhildr in the Darkness and Aoi Sakurai in the anime series Rail Wars! and Machi Tokiwa in the anime series Hanayamata. In 2015, she was cast as the character Paula McCoy in the anime series Nisekoi. In 2016, she was cast as the character Saya Endō in the anime series Dagashi Kashi and as Kano Sazanami in the anime series Magical Girl Raising Project. Trident disbanded in 2016 following the release of its last album Blue and a final concert at the Makuhari Messe Hall. In 2017, she was cast as Akane Hiyama in the anime series Love Tyrant.

Numakura made her debut as a solo music artist under the Flying Dog label in 2016. Her first single  was released on November 2, 2016; the title song is used as the opening theme to the anime television series Magical Girl Raising Project. Her second single "Climber's High!" was released on February 8, 2017; the title song is used as the opening theme to the anime series Fuuka, where Numakura plays the role of Tama. Numakura opened her official fanclub Area Nu in April 2017, and she released her first album My Live on June 14, 2017. She made an appearance at Animelo Summer Live in 2016 and she made an appearance at Animax Musix 2018. She released her second album  on February 20, 2019.

On November 25, 2019, Numakura announced that she would be ending her solo singing career after the release of a compilation album titled  on February 12, 2020 and her final concert at Toyosu Pit on February 16, 2020, although she will continue her activities as a voice actress. Her fanclub is set to close in March of the same year.

Personal life
Numakura announced her marriage to fellow voice actor Ryōta Ōsaka on October 23, 2019. She announced that she gave birth to a baby boy on December 19, 2021.

Filmography

Anime

Movies

Video games

Audio dramas

Overseas dubbing

Discography

Character albums

References

External links
 Official blog 
  
 Official agency profile 
 

1988 births
Living people
Anime singers
Arts Vision voice actors
Japanese women pop singers
Japanese video game actresses
Japanese voice actresses
Musicians from Kanagawa Prefecture
Voice actresses from Yokohama
21st-century Japanese actresses
21st-century Japanese women singers
21st-century Japanese singers